Portrait of a Man is an oil an oak panel painting by Dutch artist Frans Hals, created in 1634. It is held at the Timken Museum of Art, in San Diego. It depicts an unidentified man of the upper classes, like it can be deduced by his clothing, with his right hand on his chest, and helding his thumb high.

References

External links
 

1634 paintings
Portraits by Frans Hals
Paintings in the collection of the Timken Museum of Art
Portraits of men